The Paris Université Club (PUC) is a French rugby union club based in Paris. As at January 2023 it was in the Fédérale 1 division. 

It is the rugby section of the omnisport club (PUC).

In 2012–2013 it played in the Fédérale 2 championship (the fourth level of rugby union in France).

Palmarès 
 Semifinal in  1954–55 French Rugby Union Championship and 1957–58 French Rugby Union Championship.
 Season 2011/2012: First of its pool in Fèderal 3, promoted to Federale 2.
 2011 : relegated in Fédérale 3
 2004 : champion of Fédérale 2
 1996 : champion of 2nd XV championship
 1987 : champion Junior (Crabos)
 1986 : champion of 2nd XV championship
 1983 : Finalist, first division (group B) 
 1979 : champion Junior (Reichel)
 1969 : champion of 2nd division
 1966 : champion of 2nd XV championship

Famous players 

 Éric Alabarbe
 David Aucagne
 Roger Blachon
 Antoine Burban
 Wesley Fofana
 André Fremaux
 Arthur Gomes
 Jean-François Gourdon
 Claude Haget
 André Haget
 Eddy Joliveau
 Gérard Krotoff
 Ewen McKenzie 
 Donald Mac Donald
 Graham Mourie
 Andy Mulligan
 Nicolas Nadau
 Christian Orditz
 Max Starkey
 Chris Ralston
 Andy Ripley
 Guy Stener
 Ronnie Thompson
 John Wilcox
 Dimitri Yachvili
 Stephen Parez

Former coaches 
 Clément Dupont
 René Deleplace
 Guy Boniface
 Robert Antonin
 André Haget
 André Siné
 Guy Malvezin
 Jacques Dury
 Daniel Herrero
 Vincent Moscato
 Xavier Blond
 Frédéric Saint-SardoS

See also 
 Paris Université Club (baseball)

References 

French rugby union clubs
Rugby union clubs in Paris
Rugby clubs established in 1906
1906 establishments in France